Gaslands is a tabletop game of post-apocalyptic car combat published by Osprey Publishing in November 2017. It is designed to be played with toy cars, such as Matchbox and Hot Wheels die-cast vehicles. Players ram, skid and race their way through the wreckage of a burnt-out Earth. The game was designed by Mike Hutchinson.

The setting for the game is an alternate history where Mars was colonized in the 1980s. Tensions between Earth and Mars grew into all-out war, with Mars eventually emerging as the victor. In the setting of the game, "Gaslands" is a reality-TV show featuring car combat between desperate people seeking out an existence on the devastated Earth.

A second edition of the game, Gaslands Refuelled, was announced released in October 2019.

Awards
Gaslands won both the Judges Award and the People's Choice Award for Best Miniatures Rules at the 2018 UK Game Expo.

References

External links
Official Gaslands website

Wargames introduced in the 2010s
Post-apocalyptic games